New Brighton Pier may refer to:

New Brighton Pier, Christchurch, New Zealand
New Brighton Pier, Wallasey, England